Consider the Oyster is a book by M. F. K. Fisher that deals in the history, preparation and eating of oysters. The work was first published in the United States in 1941 and has been in print ever since.

See also 
 Consider the Lobster, by David Foster Wallace

External links 
 Synopsis by Powell's Books

Cookbooks
1941 non-fiction books
Seafood
Books about food and drink
Oysters